Les Parrott, Ph.D., is an author of Christian self-help books, a professor of psychology at Northwest University, and an ordained Nazarene minister. He is the creator of the SYMBIS Assessment, and founder of the Parrott Institute for Healthy Relationships at Olivet Nazarene University. He and his wife, Leslie Parrott, are the founders of the Center for Relationship Development at Seattle Pacific University where they taught courses out of the Marriage and Family Therapy and psychology departments.

Early life
Parrott is the son of A. Leslie Parrott Jr., former president of Olivet Nazarene University.

Media
Parrott has appeared on a variety of television shows. He hosts a weekly radio program called Love Talk.

Personal life
Parrott and his wife, Dr. Leslie Parrott, live in Seattle, Washington. They married in 1984 and have two sons, John and Jackson.

References

External links
LesAndLeslie.com
Marriage Mentoring
Les and Leslie Parrott biography on Zondervan.com

Living people
American motivational speakers
Year of birth missing (living people)
American Christian writers
American Nazarene ministers
Seattle Pacific University faculty
University of Washington faculty
Fuller Theological Seminary alumni
Olivet Nazarene University alumni